Jeffery James Luck (born 13 October 1956) is a Namibian cricket umpire. He stood in his first One Day International (ODI) match, between Canada and the Netherlands, in South Africa on 26 November 2006. He stood in his first Twenty20 International (T20I) match, between Afghanistan and Ireland, in Dubai on 9 February 2010.

In July 2019, Luck won the Administrator of the Year prize at Cricket Namibia's annual awards.

See also
 List of One Day International cricket umpires
 List of Twenty20 International cricket umpires

References

1956 births
Living people
Namibian One Day International cricket umpires
Namibian Twenty20 International cricket umpires
Sportspeople from Cape Town